On the night of 28 October 2014 at 22.00, the Macedonian government building was attacked with two projectiles, damaging the walls and roof of the building. No casualties were reported. Speculations have occurred that the event is linked to the then recent proclamation of the so-called "Republic of Ilirida". The government building was attacked by RPG rounds in 2007. The National Liberation Army (NLA), a militant organization that fought against the Macedonian government during the 2001 insurgency in Macedonia, claimed responsibly for the attack. In a press release published by Alsat, and signed by "Commander Kushtrim", the organization claimed that the "Hasan Prishtina" elite force hit the government building in a coordinated action. The organization claims it is "discontented" with the 2001 Ohrid Agreement peace plan.

Aftermath
On 21 April 2015, a group of 40 armed men with NLA patches attacked the border police station at Gošince. The group tied the policemen and beat them, then stole the arms and communication devices; they filmed the event and before they left for Kosovo, they issued this message through an interpreter: 

A shootout erupted during a police raid between police forces and an armed group identifying as the NLA occurred on 9 May 2015 in the northern town of Kumanovo.

References

Albanian nationalism in North Macedonia
Attacks in Europe in 2014
2014 crimes in the Republic of Macedonia
Crime in North Macedonia
Albanian separatism
2010s in Skopje
Terrorist incidents in North Macedonia
Crime in Skopje
Attacks on government buildings and structures
October 2014 crimes in Europe
Terrorist incidents in Europe in 2014